Hutoushan Reservoir (Hutoushan Shuiku) is a man made reservoir in Lhünzhub County, Tibet, to the north of the city of Lhasa. It is an important wintering place for black-necked cranes and other migratory birds.

Location

The reservoir lies in Qangka Township, Lhünzhub County. The villages of Gana, Tiangacun,  Seronggang and Zhujiecun lie near the lake.
The reservoir is bordered by large swamps and wet meadows, and has abundant plants and shellfish.
It takes its name from a nearby mountain, whose shape was said to resemble a tiger's head.
The reservoir lies in the Pengbo River valley.

Black-necked cranes

The endangered Black-necked cranes migrate to the middle and southern part of Tibet every winter, and may be seen on the reservoir.
The cranes migrate from the frozen Changtang Grassland in northern Tibet in mid- to late-October, and overwinter in Linzhou (Lhünzhub) County. 
They return when the weather becomes warmer, in late March. They are the only species of crane that lives and breeds at these high elevations.
In 2013 the population in Linzhou County was over 1,000.
Village volunteers patrol the  Linzhou Black-necked Crane Preservation Zone, established in 1993, where the cranes eat the remains of farm crops.
A monitoring platform has been built to watch the health of the birds.
Flocks of the birds stay on the HuTouShan Reservoir overnight, where they can be observed around daybreak before they fly off to search for forage.

References

Sources

 

Reservoirs and dams in Tibet
Lhünzhub County